Henry IV may refer to:

People
 Henry IV, Holy Roman Emperor (1050–1106), King of the Romans and Holy Roman Emperor
 Henry IV, Duke of Limburg (1195–1247)
 Henry IV, Duke of Brabant (1251/1252–1272)
 Henryk IV Probus (c. 1258–1290), Duke of Wrocław
 Henry IV, Count of Bar (1315/20–1344)
 Heinrich IV Dusemer von Arfberg (died 1353), 21st Grand Master of the Teutonic Knights
 Henry IV, Prince of Anhalt-Bernburg (died 1374)
 Henry IV of England (1367–1413), King of England and Lord of Ireland
 Henry IV, Count of Holstein-Rendsburg (1397–1427)
 Henry IV, Duke of Mecklenburg (1417–1477)
 Henry IV of Castile (1425–1474), King of Castile, nicknamed the Impotent
 Henry IV of Neuhaus (1442–1507)
 Henry IV, Duke of Brunswick-Lüneburg (1463–1514), Prince of Wolfenbüttel, nicknamed Henry the Elder or Henry the Evil
 Henry IV, Duke of Saxony (1473–1541)
 Henry IV, Burgrave of Plauen (1510–1554)
 Henry IV of Sayn (1539–1606), cathedral dean and Count of Sayn
 Henry IV of France (1553–1610), King of France and Navarre
 Heinrich IV, Prince Reuss of Köstritz (1919–2012), former head of the German Princely House of Reuss

Plays
 Henry IV, Part 1, by William Shakespeare, referring to Henry IV of England
 Henry IV, Part 2, by William Shakespeare, referring to Henry IV of England
 Henry IV (Pirandello), by Luigi Pirandello, referring to Henry IV, Holy Roman Emperor

Films
 Henry IV (1959 film), a 1959 BBC Television drama film starring Martin Miller, based on the play by Luigi Pirandello 
 Henry IV (film), a 1984 Italian film based on the Luigi Pirandello play
 Henri 4 (film), a 2010 film directed by Jo Baier.
 BBC Television Shakespeare Season Two - The First Part of King Henry the Fourth (1979)
 BBC Television Shakespeare Season Two - The Second Part of King Henry the Fourth (1979)

Other uses
 French battleship Henri IV, named after Henri IV of France